NGC 2547 is a southern open cluster in Vela, discovered by Nicolas Louis de Lacaille in 1751 from South Africa. The star cluster is young with an age of 20-30 million years.

Observations with the Spitzer Space Telescope showed a shell around the B3 III/IV-type star HD 68478. This could be a sign of recent mass loss in this star.

A study using Gaia DR2 data showed that NGC 2547 formed about 30 million years ago together with a new discovered star cluster, called [BBJ2018] 6. The star cluster NGC 2547 has a similar age compared with Trumpler 10, NGC 2451B, Collinder 135 and Collinder 140. It was suggested that all these clusters formed in a single event of triggered star formation.

NGC 2547 shows evidence for mass segregation down to 3 .

Cluster members with debris disks 
Observations with the Spitzer Space Telescope have shown that ≤1% of the stars in NGC 2547 have infrared excess in 8.0 μm and 30-45% of the B- to F-type stars have infrared excess at 24 μm.

The system 2MASS J08090250-4858172, also called ID8 is located in NGC 2547 and showed substantial brightening of the debris disk at a wavelength of 3 to 5 micrometers, followed by a decay over a year. This was interpreted as a violent impact on a planetary body in this system.

NGC 2547 contains nine M-dwarfs with 24 μm excess. These could be debris disks and the material could be orbiting close to the snow line of these stars, indicating that planet-formation is underway in these systems. Later it was suggested that these M-dwarfs might contain Peter Pan Disks. 2MASS 08093547-4913033, which is one of the M-dwarfs with a debris disk in NGC 2547 was observed with the Spitzer Infrared Spectrograph. In this system the first detection of silicate was made from a debris disk around an M-type star.

Gallery

References

External links
 
 
 SEDS – NGC 2547

2547
Open clusters
Vela (constellation)
Articles containing video clips
?